Elsa Irigoyen (18 May 1919 – 5 February 2001) was an Argentine fencer. She competed in the women's individual foil event at the 1948 and 1952 Summer Olympics.

References

1919 births
2001 deaths
Argentine female foil fencers
Olympic fencers of Argentina
Fencers at the 1948 Summer Olympics
Fencers at the 1952 Summer Olympics
Fencers from Buenos Aires
Pan American Games medalists in fencing
Pan American Games gold medalists for Argentina
Pan American Games bronze medalists for Argentina
Fencers at the 1951 Pan American Games
Medalists at the 1951 Pan American Games